Cochliobolus stenospilus is a fungal plant pathogen that causes the disease "brown stripe" in sugar cane.

References

External links 
 Index Fungorum
 USDA ARS Fungal Database

Fungal plant pathogens and diseases
Cochliobolus
Fungi described in 1928